John Grandison Allister (30 June 1927 – 11 February 1999) was a Scottish professional footballer who played as a right half for Chelsea and Aberdeen.

Allister was born in Edinburgh and played junior football with Tranent before starting his professional career with Chelsea. After a year and only four games for Chelsea, he returned north and signed for Aberdeen in 1952, where he remained until 1958. In the summer of 1959, he played in the National Soccer League with Hamilton Italo-Canadians. He later joined Deveronvale, the Banff-based Scottish Highland Football League club.

Honours 
 Aberdeen
 Scottish Football League: 1954–55
 Scottish Cup: Runner-up 1953, 1954

References 

1927 births
1999 deaths
Aberdeen F.C. players
Chelsea F.C. players
Scottish Football League players
English Football League players
Association football wing halves
Footballers from Edinburgh
Deveronvale F.C. players
Chesterfield F.C. players
Elgin City F.C. players
Tranent Juniors F.C. players
Scottish footballers
Highland Football League players
Scottish Junior Football Association players
Canadian National Soccer League players